Hsu Tzong-li (born 10 February 1956) is a Taiwanese judge who has served as the President of the Judicial Yuan since 2016.

Academic career
Hsu studied at National Taiwan University and later, in 1986, obtained his PhD in law (Dr.iur.) from the University of Göttingen in Germany. Later that year, he began teaching law at Fu Jen Catholic University and moved to NTU in 1987. He was elected dean of NTU's law school in 2002.

Legal career
He was a member of the Fair Trade Commission from 1995 to 1998 and led the Taiwan Law Society from 2001 to 2003.

Judicial Yuan
Hsu was named a member of the Judicial Yuan in 2003 and left the bench in 2011.

As president

Hsu was appointed the President of the Judicial Yuan on 25 October 2016 after his nomination was approved by legislators after a week of questioning. His selection was challenged with allegations of unconstitutionality, as Hsu had previously served on the Judicial Yuan. Article V of the Additional Articles of the Constitution governs judicial appointments, and reads, in part "Each grand justice of the Judicial Yuan shall serve a term of eight years, independent of the order of appointment to office, and shall not serve consecutive terms." The Tsai Ing-wen administration argued that Hsu was reappointed, and never served consecutive terms. The Alliance for Civic Oversight of Supreme Court Justice Nominees approved of Hsu's selection, as did the New Power Party. Subsequently, the Legislative Yuan voted 72-2 for him to assume the post and for Tsai Jeong-duen to be the Vice President. Hsu was inaugurated as the President of the Judicial Yuan on 1 November 2016 in a ceremony attended by Vice President Chen Chien-jen. Hsu appointed Lu Tai-lang the secretary-general of the Judicial Yuan and Chou Chan-chun as the head of the Judges Academy.

Political stances
Hsu stated shortly before his confirmation as President of the Judicial Yuan in October 2016 that Cross-Strait relations should be handled on a special state-to-state basis, comparing them to relations between East and West Germany.

References

1956 births
Living people
Taiwanese Presidents of the Judicial Yuan
University of Göttingen alumni
National Taiwan University alumni
Academic staff of the National Taiwan University
Academic staff of Fu Jen Catholic University